John O'Flynn (born 11 July 1982) is an Irish professional footballer who plays as a striker, most recently for Finn Harps in the League of Ireland First Division. He previously played with Barnet, Exeter City, Cork City and Limerick.

Playing career

Club

Peterborough United
O'Flynn began his career as a trainee with Peterborough United, where he has loan spells with Cambridge City and Bedford Town

Cork City
O'Flynn spent six years with Cork City, winning the League of Ireland and FAI Cup.

Barnet
In 2008, O'Flynn returned to England to play for Barnet. O'Flynn endeared himself to Barnet fans and was likened to club legend Giuliano Grazioli by former manager Paul Fairclough for his goalscoring ability. 
He was voted Barnet FC Player of the Season in 2008-9 by the clubs' supporters.

On 1 February 2010, transfer deadline day, he rejected a £100,000 move to Shrewsbury Town.

On 1 July 2010, he joined Bristol City on trial, after turning down a new contract offer from Barnet. On 20 July 2010, O'Flynn left Ashton Gate after not being offered a permanent contract.

Exeter City
On 23 July 2010, O'Flynn signed a two-year contract with Exeter City. After two seasons in League One, he signed his second contract with Exeter in July 2012.

O'Flynn was released by the club on 8 May 2014 after scoring 25 goals in 133 appearances over four seasons at St James Park.

Return to Cork City
On 1 July 2014 O'Flynn signed back for his former club until the end of the season.

Limerick
At the end of the 2015 season, O'Flynn joined Cork City's Munster rivals Limerick in the SSE Airtricity First Division, and scored some key goals in their promotion-winning campaign.
After two seasons at the club, O'Flynn left Limerick at the end of the 2017 season.

Finn Harps
O'Flynn was announced as signed for recently relegated League of Ireland First Division club Finn Harps F.C. on 26 January 2018 on a one-year deal. He left the club again at the end of 2018.

Honours
Cork City
League of Ireland
Champions: 2005
FAI Cup
Winners: 2007

Limerick
League of Ireland First Division
Champions: 2016

References

External links

Ireland stats at 11v11

1982 births
Living people
Association football forwards
Republic of Ireland association footballers
Republic of Ireland under-21 international footballers
Association footballers from County Cork
Sportspeople from Cobh
Peterborough United F.C. players
Cork City F.C. players
Barnet F.C. players
Exeter City F.C. players
Limerick F.C. players
Finn Harps F.C. players
League of Ireland players
English Football League players
Southern Football League players
Isthmian League players